Stormflower is a 1922 British silent film directed by Bert Wynne and written by Anne Merwin.

Plot 
A man's wife dies. He unknowingly adopts his own daughter, and later rejects her when she weds an officer who dies in the war.

Starring 

 Hayford Hobbs as Peter
 Joan Ferry as Stormflower
 Philip Hewland as John Fulton
 Beatrix Templeton as Cicely Fulton

References

External links

British silent films
1922 films